Rastakhiz (Persian رستاخیز "resurrection") may refer to: 

Rastakhiz F.C., an Iranian football team
Rastakhiz Party, an Iranian political party
Hussein Who Said No or Rastakhiz, a 2014 historical religious Iranian film